Bert or Herbert Nelson may refer to:

Bert Nelson, character in Darkened Rooms
Bert Nelson, co-star on Alan Watts on Living
Bert Nelson (publisher), co-founder of Track & Field News
Bert Nelson, radio host on Call For Music
Bert Nelson (trainer), trainer of big cats and bears
Herbert Nelson, actor in The Bold Ones: The Lawyers

See also
Albert Nelson (disambiguation)
Robert Nelson (disambiguation)
Hubert Nelson (disambiguation)